Suburban Sprawl Music is an American independent record label founded in 1999 in Livonia, Michigan. The label was started by Erik Koppin, who managed the label from 1999 until 2004, when the label roster decided to run Suburban Sprawl collectively. Since 2004, operations have been handled by roughly 20 individuals, ranging from label band members to friends of Suburban Sprawl. A post office box is maintained in Livonia, and records are kept in Ann Arbor.  In December 2007, Suburban Sprawl merged with Ann Arbor multimedia company, Quack!Media, and consequently is now based in Ann Arbor. Contributions to the label come from individuals in various Michigan locales, including Mount Pleasant, Lansing, and Metro Detroit in general. Suburban Sprawl artists have been actively touring the United States since the label's inception.

The label's namesake stems from urban sprawl and the label's initial base in Livonia.

Roster
 Arranged Marriage
 Desktop
 Javelins
 Love Axe
 The Pop Project
 Sea of Japan
 The Word Play

Past
 Scott Allen & The Breakdance
 Jason Anderson
 El Boxeo
 Child Bite
 The City on Film
 Sean Hoen
 Allan James and the Cold Wave
 Judah Johnson
 The Recital
 Red Shirt Brigade
 Rescue
 Nate Ruess
 Saturday Looks Good to Me
 Summersault
 Those Transatlanics
 Thunderbirds Are Now!
 Windy & Carl

See also
 List of record labels

External links
 Official site
 Article about Quack!Media, which discusses Quack!Media's merger with Suburban Sprawl

References

Record labels established in 1999
American independent record labels
Indie rock record labels
1999 establishments in Michigan